The discography of the Doug Anthony All Stars, an Australian musical comedy group, consists of one studio album, two EPs, three singles, three live albums, three video releases and three DVD releases. One studio album, Blue, was recorded, but remains officially unreleased.

Albums

Studio albums

Extended plays

Video albums

References

External links
  DAAS Unofficial Discography

Doug Anthony All Stars
Comedian discographies